Tisovec may mean:

 Tisovec, a town in central Slovakia
 Tisovec (Chrudim District), a village in the Czech Republic, in the Pardubice Region (Chrudim District)
 Tisovec, Slovenia, a settlement in the Municipality of Dobrepolje in Slovenia